Jacek Maria Majchrowski (born 13 January 1947 in Sosnowiec) is a Polish politician, lawyer, historian, professor at the Jagiellonian University, and the current mayor of Kraków since 2002; making him the longest serving mayor in the history of the city, and the only one who was elected by the townspeople five times in a row.

Biography
Majchrowski was born on 13 January 1947 in Sosnowiec. He became a member of the Democratic Left Alliance, a major left-wing Polish political party, but suspended his membership for the duration of his mayorship in Kraków. He has written 14 history books, specializing mostly in the history of Polish political thought and doctrines. On 7 December 2015, he became co-president of the Council of European Municipalities and Regions.

Selected awards
Silver Medal for Merit to Culture – Gloria Artis (Poland, 2005)
Order of Merit of the Kingdom of Hungary (Hungary, 2009)
Commander's Cross with Star of the Order of Polonia Restituta (Poland, 2011)
Decoration of Honour for Services to the Republic of Austria (Austria, 2012)
Order of Saint-Charles (Monaco, 2012)
Knight's Cross of the Legion of Honour (France, 2013)

Works 
 Geneza politycznych ugrupowań katolickich: Stronnictwo Pracy, grupa "Dziś i Jutro" (1984)
 Silni - zwarci - gotowi: Myśl polityczna Obozu Zjednoczenia Narodowego (1985)
 Szkice z historii polskiej prawicy politycznej lat Drugiej Rzeczypospolitej (1986)
 Ugrupowania monarchistyczne w latach Drugiej Rzeczypospolitej (Monarchist Groups in the Second Republic) (1988)
 Ulubieniec Cezara: Bolesław Wieniawa-Długoszowski: Zarys biografii (1990)
 Polska myśl polityczna XIX i XX wieku. Cz. 1, U źródeł nacjonalizmu: Myśl wszechpolska (1990)
 Polska myśl polityczna XIX i XX wieku. Cz. 3, Nacjonalizm: Myśl "potomstwa obozowego" (1993)
 Pierwszy ułan drugiej Rzeczypospolitej: O generale Wieniawie-Długoszowskim (1993)
 Polska myśl polityczna 1918-1939: Nacjonalizm (Polish Political Thought 1918-1939: Nationalism) (2000)
 Pierwsza Kompania Kadrowa: Portret oddziału (2002, 2004)

References

1947 births
Living people
People from Sosnowiec
Democratic Left Alliance politicians
Mayors of Kraków
20th-century Polish historians
Polish male non-fiction writers
Academic staff of Jagiellonian University
Recipients of the Order of Merit of the Republic of Hungary
Recipients of the Order of Saint-Charles
Chevaliers of the Légion d'honneur
Commanders with Star of the Order of Polonia Restituta
Recipients of the Silver Medal for Merit to Culture – Gloria Artis
21st-century Polish historians